Lucie Pelantová (born 7 May 1986 in Prague) is a Czech race walker. She competed in the 20 km kilometres event at the 2012 Summer Olympics and at the 2013 World Championships in Athletics held in Moscow, also in the 20-km walk.

References

Athletes from Prague
Czech female racewalkers
1986 births
Living people
Olympic athletes of the Czech Republic
Athletes (track and field) at the 2012 Summer Olympics
World Athletics Championships athletes for the Czech Republic